Bradford High School may refer to:

Bradford High School (Arkansas), Bradford, Arkansas
Bradford High School (Florida), Starke, Florida
Bradford High School (Ohio), Bradford, Ohio
Bradford High School (Tennessee), Bradford, Tennessee
Bradford Area High School, Bradford, Pennsylvania
Bradford Union Vocational Technical Center, Starke, Florida
Mary D. Bradford High School, Kenosha, Wisconsin
Northeast Bradford Junior/Senior High School, Rome, Pennsylvania